P. K. Mookiah Thevar (1923-1979) was an Indian politician.

Early life 

He was born to Kattamuthu Ocha Thevar and Sevenamal on 4 April 1923 in Pappapatti village, near Usilampatti, Madurai district, India. He participated in many activities as a student leader. Later, he formed the Kallar educational trust and took several steps designed for the upliftment of all backward classes community in southern Tamil Nadu.He worked for the upliftment of downtrodden people.

Political career 

Later, he joined Forward Bloc, an Indian National Political Party, formed by Subhas Chandra Bose, under the guidance of Pasumpon Muthuramalinga Thevar.

He was elected for the Periakulam Assembly constituency in 1952–1957 as a Forward Bloc candidate. He also served as a Member of the Legislative Assembly in Usilampatti for four terms (1957–1962, 1962–1967, 1967–1971, 1971, 1977–1979).

In 1971 he matched the achievement of U. Muthuramalinga Thevar in winning both Assembly and Parliament elections simultaneously. His parliamentary constituency was that of Ramanathapuram district and his period of office as an MP ran from 1971 to 1977.

As the most senior member of the Assembly, he served as the pro tem speaker in Tamil Nadu assembly in 1967 and 1977.
  
In 1963, he was elected as Vice President of All India FORWAR BLOC after the death of Pasumpon Muthuramalinga Thevar. In 1971, he was elected as the President of All India Forward Bloc.

In 1974 he made a famous speech on Kachhatheevu in the parliament . He strongly opposed the handing over of Kachhatheevu to the Sri Lankan government. He also filed a "white paper" on this issue.

Electoral records 
He was elected to the Tamil Nadu legislative assembly from Usilampatti constituency as an Independent candidate in 1957 election, and as a Forward Bloc candidate in 1962, 1967, 1971 and 1977 elections.

Later life and death 

He was the founder of three Pasumpon Muthuramalinga Thevar Colleges at Usilampatti, Neelithinallur, and Kamuthi. In these he offered free education and also free board and lodging to poor students, irrespective of their caste. He arranged for a statue of Pasumpon Muthuramalinga Thevar, his political guru, in Madurai. He was known as Urangapuli ("the tiger that doesn't sleep"). and fondly called as "Thevar thandha Thevar" ["Thevar(himself) given by Thevar(Pasumpon Muthuramalinga Thevar)"]

He died on 6 September 1979 and a statue to him was unveiled in Arasaradi by Malayandi Thevar who was former secretary general of AIFB Mill association, Madurai, in 1990.

References 

All India Forward Bloc politicians
1923 births
1979 deaths
India MPs 1971–1977
Lok Sabha members from Tamil Nadu
People from Ramanathapuram district
Madras MLAs 1957–1962
Madras MLAs 1962–1967
Tamil Nadu MLAs 1971–1976
Tamil Nadu MLAs 1977–1980